Datongqiao Town is an urban town in You County, Zhuzhou City, Hunan Province, People's Republic of China.

Cityscape
The town is divided into 9 villages and 1 community, the following areas: Shanqiao Community, Jiejiang Village, Dingjialong Village, Luotan Village, Datong Village, Heling Village, Shanhua Village, Tulou Village, Xinhutang Village, and Guanbei Village.

References

Historic township-level divisions of You County